KOI Auto Parts is an American chain of auto parts stores founded in 1946 in Newport, Kentucky. Today KOI Auto Parts operates 60 stores located throughout the US states Ohio, Kentucky, and Indiana. The corporate office of KOI Auto Parts is located in Newport, Kentucky. KOI Auto Parts is a supplier of OE and aftermarket import and domestic replacement automotive parts and accessories, automotive refinish supplies, equipment, tools and various other parts and services.

History
KOI Auto Parts originally started as Nelter Oil Company, a gas and service station, by the Neltner family, father William and sons Tony and Wilfred. In 1953 they purchased a local auto parts retailer named Kentucky Motor Service. They continued to grow, acquiring additional local auto parts retailers Wilcox Auto Parts & Savage Auto Parts, eventually changing the name of the company to KOI Auto Parts incorporating the three predominant states it did business in, K-Kentucky, O-Ohio, I-Indiana.

In 1987 KOI Auto Parts became a member of the Federated Auto Parts group. KOI Auto Parts became an ESOP, (Employee Owned) company in 1999.

In 2014 KOI Auto Parts merged with Fisher Auto Parts.

Recognitions
KOI Auto Parts is the 11th largest auto parts chain in the United States as of 2013. It was also named 2011 Automotive Aftermarket Industry Association Head of Class Award recipient and "Federated Auto Parts Outstanding Marketing Member" of the Year in 2011.

Sponsorships
KOI Auto Parts was the official auto parts store and sponsor of the Cincinnati Reds from 2009 through 2015. KOI also sponsors several other events and car shows including the annual Cavalcade of Customs car show held every year in Cincinnati which was featured on the MAVTV show Two Guys Garage in 2012, the Lawrenceburg Speedway, and the Pumpkin Run Nationals car show.

Merger
KOI Auto Parts announced, effective April 1, 2014, that Fisher Auto Parts will acquire controlling interest in the company. Fisher Auto Parts now has 470 locations, plus more than 100 independent jobbers in 18 states.

References

External links

Official website

Companies based in Cincinnati
Economy of the Midwestern United States
Automotive part retailers of the United States
American companies established in 1946
Retail companies established in 1946
1946 establishments in Kentucky